Eugene Levinson is the former principal double bassist of the New York Philharmonic and teaches at the Juilliard School.

Career
According to the New Method for Double Bass (Carl Fischer edition), Levinson, who was born in Kiev, began to study music at the age of nine. He graduated from the Leningrad Conservatory, later receiving a doctoral degree from this institution. At the age of twenty-nine, he was the youngest member ever to be appointed to the Leningrad Conservatory's faculty. In Leningrad, he also became a member of the Leningrad Philharmonic Orchestra, where he played for almost sixteen years, and was Principal Bass of the Leningrad Chamber Orchestra for thirteen years.

Levinson traveled to the United States in 1977, and began a short tenure as principal Bass of the Minnesota Orchestra soon after his arrival. While living in the States, he served on the faculty of both the Sarasota Music Festival and the Aspen Music Festival, as well as the Indiana University Summer School. He joined the bass faculty of Juilliard in 1985, and was appointed Principal Bass of the New York Philharmonic in May of that year.

In 2003, Levinson was given the Special Recognition Award in Orchestral Performance from the International Society of Bassists for his "extraordinary skills and contribution to the worldwide community of bassists".

Discography

Studio albums

The School of Agility 

The School of Agility is a book by Eugene Levinson (also published by Carl Fischer) which concentrates on improving vital fingering technique for bass players of all levels. His approach focuses on improving rhythm, intonation and fingerboard agility via a variety of fingerings.

The book includes:
-Fingerings designed to allow the individual bassist to find those most suitable to their style and level of playing.
-Fingerings appropriate to certain playing situations
-Fingerings concerned with the shaping of phrases by facilitating smoother transitions.
-Techniques to help produce a clean and clear sound.

References

External links
 Video interview with Eugene Levinson

Soviet classical double-bassists
Soviet Jews
Soviet emigrants to the United States
American classical double-bassists
Male double-bassists
Aspen Music Festival and School faculty
Juilliard School faculty
Living people
Year of birth missing (living people)
21st-century double-bassists
21st-century American male musicians